A hummingbird is a member of a family (Trochilidae) of very small birds.

Hummingbird or Humming bird may also refer to:

Music 
The Hummingbirds, an Australian jangle pop band
Gibson Hummingbird, an acoustic guitar
Humming Bird Records, a record label
Hummingbird (band), a late 1970s British rock band

Albums 
Hummingbird (Rick Wakeman and Dave Cousins album), a 2002 album
Hummingbird, a 2005 album by Jessica Robinson
Hummingbird (Local Natives album), a 2013 album
Humming Bird (Paul Gonsalves album), 1970
Hummingbird (Black Party album), 2022

Songs 
Hummingbird, a 2001 single by Merzbow
"Hummingbird" (1955 song), a 1955 pop song
"Hummingbird" (Seals and Crofts song), a single by Seals and Crofts on the 1972 album Summer Breeze
"Hummingbird", a song by Jimmy Page from the 1988 album Outrider, written and composed by Leon Russell
"Hummingbird" (Restless Heart song), covered by Ricky Skaggs
"Hummingbirds", a single by Venus Hum from the 2001 album Venus Hum
"Hummingbird", a song by Wilco on the 2004 album A Ghost Is Born
"Hummingbird", a single by Born Ruffians from the 2008 album Red, Yellow & Blue
"Hummingbird", a song by Cheryl on her 2010 album Messy Little Raindrops
"Humming Bird", a song by Indica on their 2014 album Shine

Transportation 
Boeing A160 Hummingbird, a pilotless helicopter
de Havilland Humming Bird, a 1920s ultralight monoplane
Gemini Hummingbird, ultralight aircraft
Humming Bird (train), of the Louisville and Nashville Railroad
Hummingbird Highway in Belize
Lockheed XV-4 Hummingbird, an experimental vertical takeoff jet airplane
Nelson Hummingbird PG-185B motorglider

Technology 
Hummingbird Processor, a mobile processor from Samsung

Hummingbird Ltd., a subsidiary of Open Text which produces the Exceed software product
Google Hummingbird, a search engine algorithm used by Google
See also Hummingbad, a type of malware for Android phones and tablets

Media 
Hummingbird (film), a 2013 film starring Jason Statham
The Humming Bird, a 1924 American silent crime drama film 
The Humming Bird, or Herald of Taste, the first American women's magazine edited by a woman 
Hummingbird (comics), the codename of Aracely Penalba, a Marvel Comics character
The Hummingbird, a 2019 novel
The Hummingbird (2022 film), a film adaptation of the 2019 novel

Other 
Macroglossum stellatarum, the hummingbird Hawk-moth
Idol Defense Force Hummingbird, a 1993 four-episode OVA anime series
Hummingbirds (book), 2016 book

Hummingbird cake, a Jamaican banana-pineapple spice cake